Primordial are an Irish extreme metal band from Skerries, County Dublin. The band was formed in 1993 by bassist Pól MacAmhlaigh and guitarist Ciarán MacUiliam. Their sound blends black metal and doom metal with Celtic music.

History

The band's roots stretch back to 1987 when Pól and Ciarán first began playing together with Pól's brother, Derek. The band (who were called Forsaken for a brief period) initially played a rough, hybrid mix of early, primitive thrash and death metal (playing covers of Death, Sepultura and the like).

Vocalist Nemtheanga joined the band after seeing an advertisement for a singer in Dublin specialist metal store The Sound Cellar in 1991. According to Primordial lore, the ad was pasted over no more than 2 hours after it being put up.

Upon Nemtheanga's joining the band, the band started to pursue a darker direction citing influence from Bathory, Celtic Frost and the emerging Greek and Norwegian black metal scenes.

Primordial was the first black metal styled band to emerge from Ireland with the release of their Dark Romanticism demo in the early summer of 1993 (Cruachan were also active at this time combining black metal with folk music). The band initially came to the attention of Lee Barrett from the UK label Candlelight Records but he failed to move on signing the band, so after a live soundboard recording from Dublin from 1994 was sent to Cacophonous Records (Cradle of Filth, Bal Sagoth, etc.), the band signed with them for the release of their debut album Imrama.

Although their debut album, Imrama, was characteristic as being in a more melodic black metal musical direction, they gradually came to refine their sound with A Journey's End, which included the use of mandolins and whistles and a more epic style. The two subsequent releases, The Burning Season and Spirit the Earth Aflame, showed the band's reflection of cultural geist and emotion, woven into an amalgam of black, Celtic, and folk metal musical styles. They have toured with various metal bands in the extreme metal genre, including Norwegian black metal band Immortal.

They released their dark fourth studio album Storm Before Calm in 2002, but the band's fifth album The Gathering Wilderness turned out to be a much darker and bleaker record than any Primordial had made before, providing the listener with a rawer sound as well. It was chosen as album of the month in Terrorizer magazine and appeared in many top lists of the year 2005.

In January 2006, the band played their first US show alongside Thyrfing and Moonsorrow at the Heathen Crusade metalfest in Columbia Heights, Minnesota.

The band's sixth album, To the Nameless Dead, was released on 16 November 2007 with universal praise for its raw sound used from the first or second recordings. In November and December 2010, the band entered Foel Studio in Wales to work with producer Chris Fielding once again. The resulting album, Redemption at the Puritan's Hand, was released via Metal Blade on 22 April 2011. In July 2014, Primordial announced their eighth studio album under the working title Where Greater Men Have Fallen. It was released 25 November 2014 in the US and 24 November elsewhere. On 18 April 2018, their ninth studio album Exile Amongst the Ruins was released.

Members

Current
 Alan Averill "Nemtheanga" – vocals (1993–present)
 Ciáran MacUiliam – guitar (1993–present)
 Pól MacAmhlaigh – bass (1993–present)
 Simon Ó Laoghaire – drums (1997–present)

Former 
 Micheál Ó Floinn – guitar (2001–2023)
Feargal Flannery – guitar (1997–2001)
Derek MacAmhlaigh – drums (1993–1997)

Session members
 Shauny Cadogan - guitar
 Gerry Clince (Mael Mórdha) – guitar, bass
 Feargal Flannery – guitar, bass
 Steve Hughes (Slaughter Lord, Nazxul, Apocalypse Command) – drums
 Dave McMahon – bass
 Gareth Averill – drums
 Cathal Murphy – drums
 Dave Murphy – bass

Timeline

Discography

Studio albums
Imrama (1995)
A Journey's End (1998)
Spirit the Earth Aflame (2000)
Storm Before Calm (2002)
The Gathering Wilderness (2005)
To the Nameless Dead (2007)
Redemption at the Puritan's Hand (2011)
Where Greater Men Have Fallen (2014)
Exile Amongst the Ruins (2018)

Live albums
All Empires Fall (2010)
Gods to the Godless - Live at Bang Your Head Festival Germany 2015 (2016)

EPs
The Burning Season (1999)

Demos
Dark Romanticism (1993)

Split releases
Primordial / Katatonia Split 10" (1996)
Primordial / Mael Mórdha (2006)

References

External links

Official Facebook
Official Myspace

Irish black metal musical groups
Celtic metal musical groups
Musical groups established in 1991
Musical quartets
Musical groups from County Dublin
Metal Blade Records artists
Irish folk metal musical groups
1991 establishments in Ireland